Te Rina Catherine Keenan (born 29 June 1990 in Auckland) is a New Zealand athlete whose specialty is the discus throw. She competed at the 2015 World Championships in Beijing without qualifying for the final.

Her personal best in the event is 60.78 metres (Hamilton 2015). In addition, she has a best of 16.11 metres in the shot put (Kazan 2013).

Competition record

References

External links
 

1990 births
Living people
New Zealand female discus throwers
World Athletics Championships athletes for New Zealand
Athletes from Auckland
Competitors at the 2013 Summer Universiade
Competitors at the 2015 Summer Universiade
New Zealand female shot putters